Nicolas Mollenedo Mondejar (15 September 1924 – 10 February 2019) was a Filipino Catholic bishop. He was the first bishop of the newly created Diocese of Romblon from 1974 to 1987 after his appointment to the Bishop of San Carlos, Negros Occidental. He later became its bishop-emeritus.

Life and career
Nicolas Mollenedo Mondejar was born on 15 September 1924 in the municipality of Cabatuan in Iloilo in the Philippines. He was ordained a priest on 4 April 1953 in San Miguel, Mandaluyong, Metro Manila. Seventeen years later he was ordained as a bishop, on 30 August 1970 in Jaro, Iloilo.

Mondejar died on 10 February 2019, age 94.

Education
Mondejar attended the University of Santo Tomas with a degree in philosophy and obtained a licentiate of philosophy. In 1947, he earned a licentiate in theology in the University of Santo Tomas Central Seminary. He also went to Fordham University in New York in 1959 and earned a master's degree in social services.

See also
Narciso Villaver Abellana
Bishop of Romblon

References

1924 births
2019 deaths
20th-century Roman Catholic bishops in the Philippines
Fordham Graduate School of Social Service alumni
People from Iloilo
Roman Catholic bishops of Romblon
University of Santo Tomas alumni
Filipino expatriates in the United States